Vasilis Mazarakis (Greek: Βασίλης Μαζαράκης; born 9 February 1980) is a former professional tennis player from Greece.

Career
Mazarakis teamed up with Eleni Daniilidou to represent Greece in the 2002 Hopman Cup, but they lost the qualification play-off to Italy. He did however compete for his country at the 2004 Athens Olympics, in the Men's Doubles, with Konstantinos Economidis. The pair lost in the opening round to Czechs Martin Damm and Cyril Suk.

He never entered the main draw of a Grand Slam. The biggest ATP tournament that he participated in was the 2006 Pacific Life Open at Indian Wells, a Masters Series event. He failed to progress past the first round, eliminated by Andy Murray in straight sets. Also in 2006, Mazarakis and his partner Boris Pašanski were runners-up at the ATP Buenos Aires tournament.

From 2000 to 2005, Mazarakis represented Greece in 10 Davis Cup ties. He won eight of his 14 singles rubbers and three of the five doubles matches that he played in.

ATP career finals

Doubles: 1 (1 runner-up)

ATP Challenger and ITF Futures finals

Singles: 28 (14–14)

Doubles: 8 (4–4)

Performance timeline

Singles

References

External links
 
 

1980 births
Living people
Greek male tennis players
Olympic tennis players of Greece
Tennis players at the 2004 Summer Olympics
Hopman Cup competitors
Sportspeople from Athens